White Vengeance, also known as Hong Men Yan, is a 2011 Chinese historical film directed by Daniel Lee, starring Leon Lai, Feng Shaofeng, Liu Yifei, Zhang Hanyu, Anthony Wong, Jordan Chan, Andy On, Xiu Qing and Jia Qing. The film is loosely based on events in the Chu–Han Contention, an interregnum between the fall of the Qin dynasty and the founding of the Han dynasty in Chinese history. The film's Chinese title is a reference to the Feast at Hong Gate, one of the highlights of that era.

Cast
 Leon Lai as Liu Bang
 Feng Shaofeng as Xiang Yu
 Liu Yifei as Consort Yu
 Zhang Hanyu as Zhang Liang
 Anthony Wong as Fan Zeng
 Jordan Chan as Fan Kuai
 Andy On as Han Xin
 Xiu Qing as Xiao He
 Jia Qing as Female assassin
 Ding Haifeng as Xiang Zhuang
 Zhao Huinan as King Huai II of Chu
 Sun Wenting as one of the Nangong sisters
 Meng Tongdi as one of the Nangong sisters
 Huang Ziqi as one of the Nangong sisters
 Du Yiheng as assassin
 Wu Ma as Grand Tutor
 Chen Kuan-tai as bearded warrior
 Chen Zhihui as Xiahou Ying
 Xu Xiangdong as Xiang Bo
 Du Yuming as Long Ju
 Zhao Wenhao as student Bofu

References

External links
 
 
  White Vengeance on Sina.com

Hong Kong historical action films
Films directed by Daniel Lee
Films set in the Chu–Han Contention
Films set in Xi'an
Films set in the Qin dynasty
Chinese historical films